The Priests are a classical musical group, made up of three Roman Catholic priests from the Diocese of Down and Connor in Northern Ireland. Fr. Eugene and his brother Fr. Martin O'Hagan are originally from the village of Claudy, County Londonderry with the family now residing in Derry whilst Fr. David Delargy is from Ballymena, County Antrim.

Early career
The trio have been singing together since they boarded in the 1970s as students at St MacNissi's College, Garron Tower, County Antrim. After signing a deal with SonyBMG in April 2008, the priests, all from the Diocese of Down & Connor, recorded their debut album, "The Priests", in Northern Ireland and Rome, with the unusual honour of having been allowed to record in St. Peter's Basilica, The Vatican.

Career

2008: The Priests

The eponymous album was released in Ireland on 14 November 2008 by Epic Records 
and has since been released worldwide in over thirty countries and preceded by an ITV documentary and PBS special in the United States. 
In December 2008, they scooped the Guinness World Record for "Fastest-selling UK debut for a classical act". The debut album turned 7 times Platinum in Ireland, and Platinum in UK, Sweden, Norway as well as going Gold in New Zealand, Canada and Spain. The group's concert schedule does not follow the usual band format as clauses in their bespoke contract places the emphasis on them continuing their pastoral work in their respective Parishes and in the Diocese of Down & Connor. In the 21 March issue of The Tablet, it is claimed that the album has sold more than 1 million copies in Ireland alone.

2009–2010: Harmony and Noel
In August 2009, they began recording their second album, entitled "Harmony", under the same production team. It was released in November 2009 and has reaped platinum awards in Ireland and Sweden, where the album reached the No 1 spot in the Swedish charts just before Christmas 2009.

The trio completed a very successful concert tour of UK & Ireland playing to packed houses and ending with a homecoming concert in Belfast's Waterfront Hall. Their concert itinerary also took in two concerts in the Millennium Forum in the City of Derry, the first concert coinciding with the release of the Saville Report on Bloody Sunday. They noted that it was an auspicious day for the city and for the future.

The trio's first Christmas album, Noel, was released 2 November 2010. The album debuted at number 3 on the US Top Classical Albums Chart and #18 on the Top Christian Albums Chart. In Canada, the album charted at number 100 on the Canadian Albums Chart and number 8 on the Canadian Classical Albums Chart.

In November 2010 they released an autobiography Soul Song: Reflections on an Unexpected Journey (Hardback). A paperback edition was released in April 2012.

2011–2018: Then Sings My Soul and Alleluia

In April 2012, The Priests released Then Sings My Soul – The Best of the Priests featuring one new song, "Danny Boy". The group then toured in Europe, Canada and the US.

In early 2015 the Priests re-signed their recording contract with Sony Music. Their album Alleluia was recorded in 2016 and released on 7 November 2018.

Members

Fr Eugene O'Hagan is Vicar General of the Diocese of Down and Connor. 
Fr Martin O'Hagan is Parish Priest of the Parish of Newtownards and Comber with two churches: The Church of St. Patrick (Newtownards) and the Church of Our Lady of the Visitation (Comber). Diocese of Down and Connor.
Fr David Delargy is Parish Priest of the Lough Shore Parishes of Whitehouse, Greencastle and St James in the Diocese of Down and Connor.

All three were appointed Member of the Order of the British Empire (MBE) in the 2020 New Year Honours for services to music and to charity in Northern Ireland.

Discography

Studio albums

Holiday albums

Cappella Caeciliana
The Priests were also founder members of Belfast-based choir Cappella Caeciliana, with whom they have recorded four albums:

 2001 – Cantate Domino – Music of Celebration from Cappella Caeciliana
 2005 – Sing for the Morning's Joy
 2008 – O Quam Gloriosum
 2014 – Reflecting Light

The Priests also recorded with Cappella Caeciliana the seven-minute work "Ut omnes unum sint" by James MacMillan, which appears on the choir's 2018 CD UNITY May they all be one, conducted by the composer.

See also
List of artists who reached number one in Ireland

References

External links

Official blog

Cappella Caeciliana

Musical groups from Northern Ireland
Vocal trios
British musical trios
British classical music groups